Disney Channel was a British-managed pay television channel broadcast in Ukraine. It was launched on 16 October 2010 replacing the Russian feed of Jetix, the last to close in the world. As it shared its video feed with Romania and Moldova (Pre-2012) and Bulgaria, the channel released a Ukrainian track that broadcast dubs for animated series and a live action program. On 1 January 2013, Disney Channel removed its Ukrainian track and ceased to be distributed in Ukraine, with Disney Channel content being moved to a branded slot on PLUSPLUS and NLO TV.

History 
Before the launch of the channel, some Disney programs were shown on the 1+1 channel as well as Novyi Kanal. This included voice-over on Novyi Kanal and full dubbing on 1+1. The Russian feed of Disney Channel was broadcast in Ukraine, which itself replaced the last Jetix feed in the world on 10 August 2010. The local Ukrainian feed of Disney Channel was launched on 16 October 2010.

From January 1, 2019 to July 11, 2022, the block "Disney Club" was broadcast daily on NLO TV and broadcast mostly classic animated series.

Shows 
Programmes

A.N.T. Farm
Fish Hooks
Good Luck Charlie
Gravity Falls
Hannah Montana
Jessie
Jonas
Kick Buttowski: Suburban Daredevil
Kid vs. Kat
Pair of Kings
Phineas and Ferb
Pokémon
Shake It Up
Soy Luna
Sonny with a Chance
Splatalot!
Stoked
The Suite Life of Zack & Cody
The Suite Life on Deck
Ultimate Spider-Man
Wizards of Waverly Place
Violetta
Zeke and Luther

Disney Junior programs:
Handy Manny
The Hive
Jungle Junction
My Friends Tigger & Pooh
Mickey Mouse Clubhouse
Special Agent Oso
Jake and the Never Land Pirates

References 

2010 establishments in Ukraine
2013 disestablishments in Ukraine
Defunct television stations in Ukraine
Ukraine
Television channels and stations established in 2010
Television channels and stations disestablished in 2013
Ukrainian brands
Ukrainian-language television stations